This is a list of the NCAA indoor champions in the Mile run.  This is the only event on the NCAA schedule that has not transitioned from imperial measurements to metric.  Hand timing was used until 1975, starting in 1976 fully automatic timing was used.

Champions
Key
y=yards
w=wind aided
A=Altitude assisted

References

NCAA Indoor Track and Field Championships
Middle-distance running